Methodist Girls High School, formerly Government Girls Secondary School is a private, all-female high school in Port Harcourt, Rivers State. It is owned and operated by the Methodist Church Nigeria, Port Harcourt.

References

Schools in Port Harcourt
Girls' schools in Rivers State
Christian schools in Nigeria